The Union of Social Democrats – Mensheviks and Rural Workers (SDML) was a political party in Latvia in the inter-war period led by Marģers Skujenieks.

History
The party was established in July 1921 as a breakaway faction from the Latvian Social Democratic Workers' Party. They won seven seats in the 1922 elections, becoming the third-largest faction in the 1st Saeima. In the 1925 elections they were reduced to four seats, with the party going on to win just two seats in the 1928 elections. The party was dissolved in 1929, with its leadership going onto establish the Progressive Association.

References

1921 establishments in Latvia
1929 disestablishments in Latvia
Defunct political parties in Latvia
Defunct social democratic parties
Defunct socialist parties in Europe
Mensheviks
Political parties disestablished in 1929
Political parties established in 1921
Political parties of the Russian Revolution
Social democratic parties in Europe
Socialist parties in Latvia